Vilanova de Prades is a municipality in the comarca of Conca de Barberà, in the province of Tarragona, Catalonia, Spain. It is a popular holiday resort located at high altitude atop the Serra de la Llena, close to the area where this mountain range meets the Prades Mountains.

The town appears mentioned for the first time in an 1159 document regarding the limits of Prades. The main monuments are Sant Salvador church in the centre, as well as the Sant Antoni de Pàdua shrine at the edge of the town.

References

Tomàs Bonell, Jordi; Descobrir Catalunya, poble a poble, Prensa Catalana, Barcelona, 1994

External links

 
 Government data pages 

Municipalities in Conca de Barberà